Errol Flynn was a leading film actor.

Errol Flynn can also refer to:

Errol Flynn (album), the Dogs D'Amour album
Errol Flynns, the Detroit street gang

See also 
Errol Flynn filmography